Felipe Liñán (1931 – 7 August 1975) was a Mexican cyclist. He competed in the individual and team road race events at the 1956 Summer Olympics.

References

External links
 

1931 births
1975 deaths
Mexican male cyclists
Olympic cyclists of Mexico
Cyclists at the 1956 Summer Olympics
Place of birth missing
20th-century Mexican people